The Embassy of Barbados in Washington, D.C. is the primary diplomatic mission of Barbados to the United States of America, and the Organisation of American States (OAS).  It is maintained by Ministry of Foreign Affairs and Foreign Trade Barbados. The present Ambassador is Noel Anderson Lynch, appointed on October 1, 2018, who replaced Selwin Charles Hart.

It is located to the East of the official Embassy Row area at 2144 Wyoming Avenue N.W. in Washington, D.C.'s Kalorama neighborhood.

Overview
The embassy also operates two Consulates-General in: Miami and New York City; a Permanent Mission to the United Nations in New York City; and it is also further supported by a collection of Honorary Consulates in: Atlanta, Boston, Denver, Detroit, Houston, Los Angeles, Louisville, New Orleans, Portland, San Francisco, and Toledo.

Heads of mission

History of visits 
List of diplomatic visits to the United States: North America and the Caribbean#Barbados

Chancery building history 
Former entities located at 2144 Wyoming:
James Horatio Watmough (~1912– ~1917), Naval Officer
Katharine Price Collier (~1918)
Mabel Grouitch (June 1919)
Frank L. Smith, U.S. House of Representatives (~1920)
Legation of Finland 1940–1950
Austria (~1953– ~1956)
Embassy of Morocco ( ~1958–1962)
Embassy of Syrian Arab Republic (~1962–1965)

See also

Diplomatic missions of Barbados
Embassy of the United States in Barbados
List of diplomatic missions in Washington, D.C.
Barbados – United States relations

References

External links

Diplomatic Representation for Barbados, U.S. State Department

Barbados
Washington, D.C.
Barbados–United States relations
Architecture in Washington, D.C.